Yu Guan-lin (born 29 November 1993) is a Taiwanese competitive archer. He won a bronze medal in the men's team recurve at the 2015 Asian Championships, and also competed as a member of Chinese Taipei's archery squad at the 2016 Summer Olympics.

Yu was selected to compete for the Taiwanese squad at the 2016 Summer Olympics in Rio de Janeiro, shooting both in individual and team recurve tournaments. First, Yu amassed a total of 679 points out of a maximum 720 to obtain the thirty-ninth seed heading to the knockout stage, along with his team's score of 1,995 collected from the classification round. Entering the men's team recurve as the seventh-seeded squad, Yu and fellow rookies Kao Hao-wen and Wei Chun-heng succumbed unexpectedly to a tough 2–6 defeat from the unheralded Indonesians in their elimination round match. Unable to recover from his team's premature exit, Yu was shortly eliminated in a tough 5–6 shoot-off against Norway's three-time Olympian Bård Nesteng during their opening-round encounter of the men's individual recurve.

References

External links
 

Taiwanese male archers
1993 births
Living people
People from Nantou County
Olympic archers of Taiwan
Archers at the 2016 Summer Olympics
Universiade medalists in archery
Universiade silver medalists for Chinese Taipei
Medalists at the 2015 Summer Universiade
World Archery Championships medalists
21st-century Taiwanese people